Cerezo is a municipality in the province of Cáceres, Spain.

Cerezo may also refer to:

People
Adela Cerezo Bautista (b. 1962), Mexican politician
Cerezo Haabo (b. 1994), Surinamese footballer
Cerezo Hilgen (b. 1994), Dutch footballer
Benny Frankie Cerezo (1943–2013), Puerto Rican politician
Carmen Consuelo Cerezo (b. 1940), Puerto Rican judge
Efrén Cerezo Torres (b. 1946), Mexican politician
Enrique Cerezo (b. 1948), Spanish film producer and current president of Atlético de Madrid
Francisco Cerezo (b. 1970), Spanish cyclist
Gisela Cerezo (b. 1956), Venezuelan swimmer
José Manuel Cerezo (b. 1973), Spanish runner
Juan Cerezo de Salamanca, interim Spanish governor of the Philippines (1633–1635)
Mateo Cerezo (1637–1666), Spanish painter
Nieves Herrero Cerezo (b. 1957), Spanish journalist
Pedro Cerezo Galán (b. 1935), Spanish philosopher
Sebastián Cerezo (fl. 1780), Spanish dancer
Toninho Cerezo (b. 1955), Brazilian footballer
Vinicio Cerezo (b. 1942), Guatemalan politician

Places
Cerezo de Abajo, a municipality  in the province of Segovia, Spain
Cerezo de Arriba, a municipality in the province of Segovia, Spain
Cerezo de Río Tirón, a municipality in the province of Burgos, Spain

Other uses
Cerezo Osaka, Japanese football club